Square One is the debut single album by South Korean girl group Blackpink. It was released digitally on August 8, 2016, by YG Entertainment. The lyrics were written by B.I, Teddy Park, Bekuh Boom while the music was composed by Teddy Park, Future Bounce and Bekuh Boom.

Promotion 
To promote Square One, Blackpink held its first live performances of "Whistle" and "Boombayah" at the SBS Inkigayo on August 14, 2016. A week later, on August 21, the group won its first award during a musical program for "Whistle" at Inkigayo.

Commercial performance 
Both singles of Square One debuted in the top ten of the Gaon Digital Chart in South Korea. "Whistle" debuted at number one and "Boombayah"  at number seven on the chart. The two singles as well as the tracks on Blackpink's second single album Square Two combined sold a total of 113,000 digital song downloads in the U.S. by August 2017.

Track listing

Charts

Weekly charts

"Whistle"

"Boombayah"

Accolades

References 

Blackpink albums
Korean-language albums
YG Entertainment albums
Genie Music albums
2016 albums
Single albums